Barsine roseororatus is a species of moth of the family Erebidae, subfamily Arctiinae. It is found in Peninsular Malaysia and Borneo. It has also been recorded as a millet pest in India. This is a frequent species that is found in forested and disturbed habitats in the lowlands and more rarely up to about 2000 meters.

References

External links
The Moths of Borneo

Nudariina
Moths of Asia
Moths described in 1877
Insect pests of millets